Novoalexandrovsk is a town in Stavropol Krai, Russia.

Novoalexandrovsk may also refer to:
Novoalexandrovsk Urban Settlement, a municipal formation which the Town of Novoalexandrovsk in Novoalexandrovsky District of Stavropol Krai, Russia is incorporated as
Novoalexandrovsk, name of Zarasai, a town in Lithuania, in 1836–1918

See also
Novoalexandrovka (disambiguation)
Novoalexandrovsky (disambiguation)
Alexandrovsk (disambiguation)